Dorry Kahn-Weyl (1896-1981) was a Dutch artist.

Biography 
Kahn-Weyl née Weyl was born on 	19 May 1896 in Amsterdam. She was a self-taught painter. In 1921 she married Henri René Kahn (18881970) with whom she had two children. René Kahn was the director of the family fashion house Hirsch & Cie. 

Her work was included in the 1939 exhibition and sale Onze Kunst van Heden (Our Art of Today) at the Rijksmuseum in Amsterdam.

Kahn-Weyl's husband was arrested in 1941 after his brother gave an anti-German speech. In 1942 he was arrested again, prompting Dorry and the children to hide in Veluwe. 

Kahn-Weyl died on 29 August 1981 in Amsterdam.

References

1896 births
1981 deaths
Artists from Amsterdam
20th-century Dutch women artists